Genaro (from the Latin Januarius, meaning "devoted to Janus") may refer to
Genaro (given name)
Genaro (surname)
Genaro P. and Carolina Briones House in Austin, Texas, United States

See also
Gennaro (disambiguation)